Richard Griffin may refer to:

Richard Griffin (sailor) (born 1935), sailor from the United States Virgin Islands
Richard Griffin and Company, publishers to the University of Glasgow in the 19th century
Richard Allen Griffin (born 1952), judge for the United States Court of Appeals for the Sixth Circuit
Richard J. Griffin, head of the Bureau of Diplomatic Security 2005–2007, Acting Inspector General of Department of Veterans Affairs 2013–2015
Richard Griffin, 2nd Baron Braybrooke (1750–1825), British politician and peer
Richard Griffin, 3rd Baron Braybrooke (1783–1858), British Whig politician and literary figure
Ric Griffin, fictional character in Holby City
Rick Griffin (1944–1991), American artist
Professor Griff (born 1960), American rapper
Dick Griffin (born 1939), American trombonist
Dr. Richard Griffin, Chairman of the Poor Law Medical Reform Association

Griffin, Richard